Hakan Gülsün (1960–2009) was a Turkish art historian, Ph.D. of Art History at the Istanbul Technical University in Istanbul. He had been a curator at the Dolmabahçe Palace in Istanbul since 1986.

Hakan Gülsün died on 9 June 2009.

Biography
As the son of a Turkish family, he was born in Istanbul, Turkey. He graduated from Istanbul University and completed his postgraduate studies at the Istanbul University under Professor Nurhan Atasoy. He got his Ph.D. at Istanbul Technical University in the Faculty of Architecture. His thesis was titled "Status Of Dolmabahçe and Çerağan Palaces In the 19th Century" (May 1999).

Works
Gülsün lastly taught the General Education class titled "Art in Europe" in both Bahçeşehir University and Yıldız Technical University while continuing his Curatorship at Dolmabahçe Palace.

Books
 Beylerbeyi Sarayı  TBMM Vakfı Yayınları (İstanbul, 1993)
 Marko Paşa Köşkü  Deniz Kuv. Komutanlığı Yay. (1994)
 Küçüksu Kasrı  TBMM Vakfı Yayınları (İstanbul, 1995)
 Dolmabahçe Sarayı  TBMM Milli Saraylar Daire Bşk. Yay. (İstanbul, 2005)
 Geçmişten Günümüze Selimiye Kışlası  TBMM Milli Saraylar Daire Bşk. Yay. (İstanbul, 2005)

References

Writers from Istanbul
Turkish art historians
1960 births
2009 deaths
Curators from Istanbul